Chambal is a 2019 Indian Kannada thriller film written and directed by Jacob Verghese and produced by N. Dinesh Rajkumar and Mathew Verghese jointly under the banners Jacob Films and Jadyan Motion Pictures. It features Satish Ninasam and Sonu Gowda along with Roger Narayan. The supporting cast includes Pawan Kumar, Achyuth Kumar, Kishore Kumar and Elvis Joseph. The score and soundtrack for the film is by Poornachandra Tejaswi and Judah Sandhy and the cinematography is by D. Sasi Kumar and editing is done by Bavan Sreekumar

The film is loosely based on the life of D. K. Ravi.

Plot

Cast 

 Sathish Ninasam as Subhash
 Sonu Gowda as Lakshmi
 Roger Narayan
 Pawan Kumar
 Achyuth Kumar
 Kishore
 Elvis Joseph
 Girija Lokesh
 Ramesh Bhat
 Puneeth Rajkumar as Narrator

Soundtrack 

The film's background score and the soundtracks were composed by Poornachandra Tejaswi and Judah Sandhy. The music rights were acquired by Zee Music Company.

Critical reception 
Vivek M V from the Deccan Herald gave the film 3.5 stars out of 5, saying it "isn't entirely moving but it's a satisfying thriller that keeps you engaged throughout." A Sharadhaa from The New Indian Express also gave the film 3.5 stars out of 5: "This sincere film is a good watch, and director Jacob Verghese's brilliance lies in the way he slowly builds the character of the protagonist, based on late IAS officer DK Ravi."

Notes

References

External links 

 

2010s Kannada-language films
Indian biographical drama films
2019 drama films
Films shot in Mysore
Films shot in Bangalore
2019 films
Films directed by Jacob Verghese
Films about corruption in India
Chambal River
Illegal mining in India
Indian political thriller films
Films set in Karnataka